Touching Home is a 2008 American drama film directed by Logan and Noah Miller and starring Ed Harris, Brad Dourif, and Robert Forster.

Cast
 Ed Harris as Charlie Winston
 Brad Dourif as Clyde Winston
 Robert Forster as Jim "Perk" Perkins
 Logan Miller as Lane Winston
 Noah Miller as Clint Winston
 Evan Jones as Timmy "Mac" McClanahan
 Lee Meriwether as Helen
 John Laughlin as Walter Houston
 James Carraway as Jimmy
 Brandon Hanson as Brownie
 David Fine as Roy Rivers
 George Maguire as Pete

Production
After their homeless father died in jail, Logan and Noah Miller vowed that their autobiographical film would be made as a dedication to him. With no money and no contacts, they found Ed Harris in a San Francisco alley, and later assembled a cast and crew with 11 Academy Awards and 28 nominations.

The Miller brothers wrote a book describing the making of the film,

Reception
Touching Home received mixed reviews. On  Rotten Tomatoes it has an approval rating of 50% rating based on reviews from 14 critics.

References

External links
 
 
 
 
Reviews
 Entertainment Weekly
 Huffington Post
 Ain't It Cool News
 New York Times

2008 films
2008 drama films
American drama films
Films shot in California
American independent films
2000s English-language films
2000s American films